People's Anti-Imperialist Association was a political party in Xinjiang, China during the rule of Sheng Shicai, between 1935 and 1942.

History 

The People's Anti-Imperialist Association was founded by Sheng Shicai in Ürümqi on 1 August 1935. The propaganda outlet of the Association was the Anti-Imperialist War Front. The Sinkiang's Youth and the Sinkiang's Women served as the Association's youth and women's wing respectively. The Association saw a large increase in membership. In 1935 it had 2,489 members, in 1937 the membership grew to 5,281, and in 1939 the Association's membership rose to 10,000. The membership was nationally diverse, and included Han, Hui and various Turkic peoples.

The ideology of the People's Anti-Imperialist Association were the "Six Great Policies", issued by Sheng in December 1934. The Policies guaranteed his previously enacted "Great Eight-Point Manifesto" and included "anti-imperialism, friendship with the Soviet Union, racial and national equality, clean government, peace and reconstruction". Sheng referred to them as "a skillful, vital application of Marxism, Leninism, and Stalinism in the conditions of the feudal society of economically and culturally backward Sinkiang". They served as the ideological basis of Sheng's rule. With the proclamation of the Six Great Policies, Sheng adopted a new flag with a six-pointed star to represent these policies.

With Sheng's rapprochement with the Central government, the Kuomintang spread throughout the province, replacing the People's Anti-Imperialist Association, which was disbanded in April 1942.

Notes

Footnotes

References

Books

Journals

Websites 

 

1935 establishments in China
1942 disestablishments in China
Political parties established in 1935
Political parties disestablished in 1942
Parties of one-party systems
Political parties in the Republic of China
Defunct political parties in China
Formerly ruling communist parties